Maarn is a town in the municipality of Utrechtse Heuvelrug in the Dutch province of Utrecht. It is located about 10 km (6.2 mi) east of Zeist.

In 2001, the town of Maarn had 4,071 inhabitants. The built-up area of the town was 1.26 km2; it contained 1,793 residences. Until 2006, Maarn was its own municipality, covering both Maarn and neighbouring Maarsbergen.

Maarn is a small town in the heart of the Utrechtse Heuvelrug, a protected nature reserve in the Netherlands. The town and its surroundings have approximately 8,000 inhabitants, a small centre and are probably best known for tourism to the numerous camp-sites that surround the town.

History 
Maarn was built in 1921 for the workers who worked in the sand excavation of the Dutch Railways. In 2003 municipality was renovated according to current standards and regulations.

Transportation 
Railway station: Maarn

Gallery

References

External links 

 Map

Municipalities of the Netherlands disestablished in 2006
Populated places in Utrecht (province)
Former municipalities of Utrecht (province)
Utrechtse Heuvelrug